United States gubernatorial elections were held in 1952, in 30 states, concurrent with the House, Senate elections and presidential election, on November 4, 1952 (September 8 in Maine).

Results

See also 
1952 United States elections
1952 United States presidential election
1952 United States Senate elections
1952 United States House of Representatives elections

References 

 
November 1952 events in the United States